Elizabeth Bell (20 March 1941 – 21 October 2012) was an English stage and television actress.

Early life
Bell was born in 1941 in Leeds, West Riding of Yorkshire, the daughter of Elizabeth and Neil Bell. The family moved to Scarborough, North Riding of Yorkshire when she was four, after her father left. She attended the girls' high school there. She then decided to attend Central School of Speech and Drama in London.
In 1971 she was living with the architect Henry Osborne, and they were married in 2011. She died of oesophageal cancer in 2012.

Acting career 

Her career was closely associated in particular with Alan Ayckbourn whom she knew from her early work in Scarborough to being her neighbour in London.

Bell appeared with English Stage Company at the Royal Court Theatre, the National theatre, the Almeida, the Pleasance, the Bush and in the West End. She appeared in the first season of the dedicated Theatre in the round at Stoke-on-Trent. Bell was also a regular on television and in radio productions. She was a founder member of the Victoria theatre, which is now known as the New Vic.

Bell went on to become a mentor for Central School students as well as an external examiner for Trinity College London

Awards and criticism

1961 The gold medal and Sybil Thorndike prize, Central School of Speech and Drama, London

Alan Ayckbourn said of her:

To act with, she was a joy. To direct, she was often challenging, forever questioning, not content to accept things purely on face value and, like any good actor, never settling for anything less than dramatic truth. If that makes her sound a tough proposition, then once her questions were answered, doubts reassured, she was fiercely loyal to you and the production.

Stage performances

 1966 Beset by Women in the Prince of Wales Theatre
 1970 The Soldier’s Fortune in the Royal Court 
 1987 A View from the Bridge at The National Theatre 
 1989 The Revengers' Comedies in the theatre in the round at Scarborough, 
 1990  Othello in Scarborough
 1992 Euripides’ Medea  at the Almeida 
 1996 Goldhawk Road at the Bush Theatre
 1998 Richard III at the Pleasance
 2005 The UN Inspector at the National Theatre
 2007 The History Boys for the NT at Wyndham's Theatre

Screen performances

References

External links
 

1941 births
2012 deaths
20th-century English actresses
21st-century English actresses
English film actresses
English television actresses
English stage actresses
Deaths from esophageal cancer
Deaths from cancer in England
Alumni of the Royal Central School of Speech and Drama
Actors from Scarborough, North Yorkshire